Antonio "Tonino" Accolla (6 April 1949 – 14 July 2013) was an Italian actor and voice actor.

Biography
Accolla began his career in the late 1970s making his very first dubbing contribution in the 1979 film Apocalypse Now. He was also notable for providing the Italian voice of Eddie Murphy in all his live action roles until he passed on the role to Sandro Acerbo in 2009, as well as dubbing over the voice of Homer Simpson in the animated sitcom The Simpsons until his death in 2013.

Other actors he dubbed over are Kenneth Branagh, Tom Hanks, Mickey Rourke, Ralph Fiennes, Jim Carrey, Ben Stiller, and Gary Oldman (Léon and The Fifth Element), as well as the voice of Timon in the animated film The Lion King.

Personal life
Accolla was the father of voice actor Lorenzo Accolla and he was also the uncle of voice actress Natalia Accolla.

Death
Accolla died on 14 July 2013, after suffering a long illness. The voice of Homer Simpson was passed on to voice actor and comedian Massimo Lopez.

Dubbing roles

Animation
Homer Simpson in The Simpsons (seasons 1-23)
Homer Simpson / Fat Tony in The Simpsons Movie
Timon in The Lion King
Timon in The Lion King 1½
Mike Wazowski in Monsters, Inc.
Mushu in Mulan 2
Mushu in Disney's House of Mouse
Goemon Ishikawa XIII in The Castle of Cagliostro (1^ dub.)

Live action
Reggie Hammond in 48 Hrs.
Reggie Hammond in Another 48 Hrs.
John Gray in 9½ Weeks 
Ace Ventura in Ace Ventura: Pet Detective 
Ace Ventura Ace Ventura: When Nature Calls 
Pluto Nash in The Adventures of Pluto Nash 
Harry Angel in Angel Heart 
Detective Axel Foley in Beverly Hills Cop
Detective Axel Foley in Beverly Hills Cop II
Detective Axel Foley in Beverly Hills Cop III
Marcus Graham in Boomerang 
Kit Ramsey / Jeffernson "Jiff" Ramsey in Bowfinger 
Bruce Nolan in Bruce Almighty 
Mitch Robbins in City Slickers 
Wadsworth the Butler in Clue 
Jack Bonner in Cocoon 
Prince Akeem Joffer / Clarence / Randy Watson / Saul in Coming to America 
Charlie Hinton in Daddy Day Care 
Mike Church in Dead Again 
Michael Bosworth in Desperate Hours 
Thomas Jefferson Johnson in The Distinguished Gentleman
Doctor John Dolittle in Dr. Dolittle
Doctor John Dolittle in Dr. Dolittle 2
White Goodman in Dodgeball: A True Underdog Story 
Detective Pep Streebeck in Dragnet
James "Thunder" Early in Dreamgirls
Jean-Baptiste Emanuel Zorg in The Fifth Element
Evan Danielson in Imagine That
Cyrus Paice in Get Carter
Bill Paxton in Ghosts of the Abyss 
Chandler Jarrell in The Golden Child
Quick in Harlem Nights 
Jim Evers in The Haunted Mansion
Henry V in Henry V
G in Holy Man
Kelly Robinson in I Spy
Joe Banks in Joe Versus the Volcano 
President Thomas J. Whitmore in Independence Day
Stuart Dunmeyer in Mrs. Doubtfire
Little Junior Brown in Kiss of Death 
Norman Stansfield in Léon 
Rayford Gibson in Life 
Mister Jigsaw in Loaded Weapon 1 
LeVar Burton in Reading Rainbow
Willie Mays Hayes in Major League
Charlie Baileygates / Hank Evans in Me, Myself & Irene
Inspector Scott Roper in Metro 
Walter Fielding Junior in The Money Pit
Buddy Young Junior in Mr. Saturday Night
Benedick in Much Ado About Nothing
Detective Nordberg in The Naked Gun: From the Files of Police Squad! 
Detective Nordberg in The Naked Gun 2½: The Smell of Fear
Detective Nordberg in Naked Gun : The Final Insult
Samuel Faulkner in Nine Months 
Norbit / Rasputia Latimore / Mister Wong in Norbit
Professor Sherman Klump / Buddy Love / Lance Perkins / Papa Cletus Klump / Mama Anna Pearl Jensen Klump / Granny Ida Mae Jensen / Ernie Klump Senior in The Nutty Professor
Professor Sherman Klump / Buddy Love / Lance Perkins / Papa Cletus Klump / Mama Anna Pearl Jensen Klump / Granny Ida Mae Jensen / Ernie Klump Senior in Nutty Professor II: The Klumps
Andrew Benson in Peter's Friends 
General Thade in Planet of the Apes
Arnold Billings in Power 
Joel Goodson in Risky Business 
Officer Trey Sellars in Showtime
Dennis Cleg in Spider 
Allen Bauer in Splash 
Lenny Nero in Strange Days
Cadet Captain Alex Dwyer in Taps 
Leonardo in Teenage Mutant Ninja Turtles II: The Secret of the Ooze
Leonardo in Teenage Mutant Ninja Turtles III 
Mister White in That Thing You Do!
Trevor Reznik in The Machinist 
Ted Stroehmann in There's Something About Mary 
Michael Kellam in Three Men and a Baby
Brock Lovett in Titanic
Billy Ray Valentine in Trading Places
Bill Firpo in Trapped in Paradise 
Simon in True Lies 
Detective Scott Turner in Turner & Hooch 
Maximillian in Vampire in Brooklyn
Harry Burns in When Harry Met Sally... 
Sidney Deane in White Men Can't Jump 
James Wheeler in Wild Orchid

Video games
Homer Simpson in The Simpsons Game

References

External links 

1949 births
2013 deaths
Italian male voice actors
Italian male film actors
Italian male television actors
Italian male stage actors
Italian male video game actors
Italian voice directors
People from Syracuse, Sicily
Nastro d'Argento winners
20th-century Italian male actors
21st-century Italian male actors